Odense Municipality is a Danish municipality (kommune) in Southern Denmark on the island of Funen in central Denmark. January 2022). It is the most populous municipality in Region of Southern Denmark.

The main town and the site of its municipal council is the city of Odense. Including the social sector, 17,000 people are employed by the municipality. The municipal budget is 6,881 million DKK as of 2006. The municipality runs 37 schools; Odense is also the home of 13 private schools.

Neighboring municipalities are Kerteminde to the east, Faaborg-Midtfyn to the south, Assens to the west, and Nordfyn to the north.

Geography
The Odense municipality is located near the Odense Fjord.  The Odense Canal (Odense Kanal) flows out from the fjord and forms three ports in the city's industrial area.  The Odense River (Odense Å) also flows out from the fjord and meanders through the municipality, including Odense town center where Sankt Jørgens Park and Munke Mose are located on its banks.  The river springs from Lake Arreskov (Arreskov Sø) in Faaborg-Midtfyn municipality.

History

Odense municipality was not merged with other municipalities by 1 January 2007 as the result of the nationwide Kommunalreformen ("The Municipal Reform" of 2007). Before this reform, the list of neighboring municipalities were Langeskov to the east, Munkebo to the northeast, Otterup to the north, Søndersø, Vissenbjerg, and  Tommerup to the west, and Broby and Årslev to the south. Odense belonged to Funen County 1970-2006 and before this to Odense County.

Politics
Odense's municipal council consists of 29 members, elected every four years. The municipal council has five political committees.

Municipal council
Below are the municipal councils elected since the Municipal Reform of 2007.

Mayors

The former mayor of Odense Municipality, Anker Boye, is a member of the Social Democratic Party. His first term was from 1993 to 2005 when he was defeated by Jan Boye, a Conservative. He was re-elected in the 2009 election, forming a coalition with the Red–Green Alliance, the Socialist People's Party and the Social Democrats.

The following is a list of mayors since 1792:

Lauritz Martin Bendz (1792–97) 	
Andreas Rosteen Lindved (1798–1816) 		
Lauritz Martin Bendz (1816–24)
Christian Reimuth (1824–46)
Christen Estrup (1847–60) 
Louis Mourier (1861–77) 	
G. Koch (1877–97)
J.F. Simony (1897–1900)
Ludvig Dithmer (1900–11)
Valdemar Bloch (1911–19)
J.L. Christensen (1919)
A.P. Henriksen (1919–25) 	
H. Chr. Petersen (1925–37) 	
I. Vilh. Werner (1937–58)
Holger Larsen (1958–73)
Verner Dalskov (1973–93) 	
Anker Boye (1994–2005) 	
Jan Boye (2006–09) 		
Anker Boye (2010–2017)
Peter Rahbæk Juel (2018-)

Neighbourhoods and settlements
After the city of Odense itself, the next most populous locations in the Municipality are:

The municipality of Odense is divided into 11 different sectors. Neighbourhoods, suburbs and surrounding villages of the city of Odense include:

Agedrup
Allesø
Åløkke
Anderup
Åsum
Blangstedgård
Bolbro
Bullerup
Bellinge
Blommenslyst
Bregnor
Bymidten
Dalum
Dyrup
Elmeluad
Ejlstrup
Fraugde
Fruens Bøge
Hauge
Hjallese
Højby, Funen
Højme
Højstrup
Holmstrup
Hunderup
Kirkendrup
Korsløkke
Korup
Kragsbjerg
Lindved
Lumby
Marienlund
Munkebjerg
Neder Holluf
Næsby
Paarup
Rosengård
Sanderum
Seden
Skibhusene
Skibhuskvarteret
Slukefter
Snestrup
Søhus
Stenløse
Stige
Tarup
Tornbjerg
Ubberud
Villestofte
Vollsmose

The city of Odense 

Odense is the third largest city in Denmark, and one of country's oldest settlements. The first record of its existence dates from 988 and the town celebrated its 1,000th anniversary in 1988. The name refers to Odin in Norse mythology— Odins Vi ("Odin's Sanctuary"). The shrine of Canute the Saint was a great resort of pilgrims throughout the Middle Ages. His relics are still preserved in Saint Canute's Cathedral. In the 16th century the town was the meeting-place of several parliaments, and down to 1805 it was the seat of the provincial assembly of Funen.

Denmark's famous author and poet Hans Christian Andersen was born in Odense on 2 April 1805. Museums honouring him have been created both in a house in the old part of Odense with a large collection of his works and belongings, and his childhood home, which is also located in the city.

Odense also has a museum honouring the classical composer Carl Nielsen, who was born in Nr. Lynelse near Odense.

Transportation
The municipality is connected with all points on the island with an extensive system of roads, including the major E20 Funish Motorway (Fynske Motorvej) which runs across the island through the town of Odense and connect the island on the east to the island of Zealand over the Great Belt Bridge and on the west to the Danish mainland, Jutland over the Little Belt Bridge. A motorway built 2006-2009 connects Odense to the island's second-largest city, Svendborg, which also has a railroad connection (Svendborgbanen).  The town of Odense is also a major stop on the national railroad system lines.

See also

 List of twin towns and sister cities in Denmark

References

Further reading
 Municipal statistics: NetBorger Kommunefakta, delivered from KMD aka Kommunedata (Municipal Data) and Danmarks Statistik - statistikbanken.dk The Danish Census Bureau
 Municipal mergers and neighbors: Eniro map with named municipalities

External links 

 
 Odense tourism bureau
 List of twin cities and towns
 Krak searchable/printable map(outline of municipality does not print out!)

 
Municipalities of the Region of Southern Denmark
Municipalities of Denmark